Joanna Watkins Bourne is an American, best-selling author of historical romance novels set in Europe during the Napoleonic wars. Her novels about a group of spies have won numerous awards. Her books have been described as "witty, beautifully descriptive, [and] cleverly plotted". The Spymaster's Lady is frequently cited as a reader favorite, with a spy hero who is both 'alpha' and 'beta' and a spy heroine who is "brave and clever". Rogue Spy, which features a code-breaker and a British service agent, was listed by Library Journal as one of the ten best romances of 2014.

Biography
Joanna Bourne graduated from Goucher College and Georgetown University.  After working as a research analyst for the Congressional Research Service in Washington, DC, she taught English in Africa.  Then she joined the State Department as a Foreign Service Officer.  She has lived in England, France, Germany, Nigeria, Iran, and Saudi Arabia. She currently lives in the Blue Ridge mountains.

Bourne's first novel, Her Ladyship’s Companion, was published in 1983 by Avon.  She did not write her second novel until 25 years later.

Bibliography

 Her Ladyship's Companion (1983)
 Spymaster's Lady (2008)
 My Lord and Spymaster (2008)
 The Forbidden Rose (2010)
 The Black Hawk (2011)
 Rogue Spy (2014)
 Beauty Like the Night (2017)

Awards
2009 - Romance Writers of America RITA Award winner for Best Regency Historical Romance, My Lord and Spymaster
2009 - Romance Writers of America RITA Award finalist for Best Historical Romance, Spymaster's Lady
2011 - Romance Writers of America RITA Award finalist for Best Historical Romance, The Forbidden Rose
2012 - Romance Writers of America RITA Award winner for Best Historical Romance, The Black Hawk
2014 - Library Journal, Ten best romances of 2014, Rogue Spy

References

External links

20th-century American novelists
21st-century American novelists
American romantic fiction writers
American women novelists
Georgetown University alumni
RITA Award winners
Living people
20th-century American women writers
21st-century American women writers
Goucher College alumni
Year of birth missing (living people)